The Dearhunters were an indie and alternative country band from Sydney, Australia.

History
In 1998, Greg Hitchcock, Tim Oxley, Jodi Phillis and Raphael Whittingham, who were successful artists solo or in various other acts, formed The Dearhunters in a pub in Sydney. They first performed several times under the name "Lunar Tunes" in April 1998. The group released a single album, "Red Wine and Blue" which was recorded in roughly three weeks, and released under Candle Records in 1999; it was launched at the Hopetoun Hotel in Surry Hills. On working on the album, Phillis said in an interview that "in this group I feel free to explore any territory and I’m not afraid to get too introspective or sentimental". She went on further to say that The Dearhunters was a side project for her.

They also appeared on a compilation featuring artists or groups under Candle Records, as well as releasing a split EP shared with Hired Guns, which was released on vinyl. "Red wine and blue" features dual vocals between Oxley and Phillis, and as a group, they have produced favorable reviews. Following the release of their split EP in 1999 and full length album in the same year, Whittingham left the group and was replaced by Ashton. Then, after a small subsequent tour following their album release, the group disbanded and returned to prior musical projects or engaged in new ones.

Discography

Split 7" (1999)
Red Wine and Blue (1999)

Compilations
'Banter' Candle Compilation (2000)

Members
Dave Ashton -  drums (1999–2000)
Greg Hitchcock - guitars (1998–2000)
Tim Oxley - vocals, bass (1998–2000)
Jodi Phillis - vocals, guitar (1998–2000)

Former Members
Raphael Whittingham - drums (1998–1999)
Information on band members.

References

New South Wales musical groups